Alexander Razgulin (born 1963) is a Russian mathematician, Professor, Dr.Sc., a professor at the Faculty of Computer Science at the Moscow State University.

He defended the thesis «Stable method for solving linear equations with noncompact operators and its applications to control and observation problems» for the degree of Doctor of Physical and Mathematical Sciences (2009).

Author of 24 books and more than 100 scientific articles.

References

Bibliography

External links
 MSU CMC
 Scientific works of Alexander Razgulin
 Scientific works of Alexander Razgulin

Russian computer scientists
Russian mathematicians
Living people
Academic staff of Moscow State University
1963 births
Moscow State University alumni